"My Feet Keep Dancing" is the third single from Chic's third studio album Risqué. It features a co-lead vocal by Luci Martin and Bernard Edwards and a tap dance solo by Fayard Nicholas (of the Nicholas Brothers), Eugene Jackson (of Our Gang), and Sammy Warren.

Cash Box described it as an "ear-catching dance concoction, with its rhythmic use of strings."  Record World called it "a fine example of how Chic sets the standards for today's dance music."

Track listings
Atlantic 7" 3683, 1979
 A. "My Feet Keep Dancing" (7" Edit) - 4:16
 B. "Will You Cry (When You Hear This Song)" - 4:05

Atlantic promo 12" DSKO 220
 A. "My Feet Keep Dancing" - 6:38
 B. "Will You Cry (When You Hear This Song)" - 4:05

Chart
It reached #21 on the UK singles chart in January 1980, spending 9 weeks on the chart. It failed to enter US Billboard R&B chart Top 40 peaking at #42.  On the disco chart, "My Feet Keep Dancing, along with the cuts, "Good Times" and "My Forbidden Lover" went to #3

References

1979 singles
Chic (band) songs
Song recordings produced by Nile Rodgers
Songs written by Nile Rodgers
Songs written by Bernard Edwards
Song recordings produced by Bernard Edwards